Priabona may refer to:
 Priabona (fly), a fossil genus of big-headed flies
 Priabona (Monte di Malo), the northern Italy type locality of the Priabonian stratigraphic stage